Doug Spangenberg is an American music video director.

Live music videos (directed) 
Jamey Johnson
Adam Lambert – "Glam Nation Live"
Kelis – VEVO "Summer Sets"
N.E.R.D
Harry Connick Jr. – Sessions @ AOL
John Legend
Boys Like Girls – "Read Between the Lines" DVD
Lamb of God – "Terror and Hubris"
Lamb of God – "Killadelphia" (certified RIAA platinum)
Lamb of God – "Walk With Me In Hell" (certified RIAA platinum)
Every Time I Die – "Shit Happens" (2006)
Every Time I Die – "The Dudes and Don'ts Of Recording" (released with The Big Dirty deluxe edition album, 2007)
Every Time I Die – "Party Pooper" (released with New Junk Aesthetic special edition, 2009)
Every Time I Die – "Shit Happens: The Series" (2010)
Unearth – "Alive from the Apocalypse"
Coheed and Cambria – "Neverender" (debuted at #1 on Billboard's Top Music Video chart) (certified RIAA gold)
Coheed and Cambria – "We Are Together, We Tour Together" (released with The Afterman: Ascension deluxe edition album, 2012)
Hellfest – "Hellfest 2000"
Hellfest – "Hellfest 2002"
Hellfest – "Hellfest Vol. 3"
Mindless Self Indulgence – "Our Pain, Your Gain"
Sounds of the Underground – "Sounds of the Underground"

Music videos (directed) 
N.E.R.D – Life As A Fish
N.E.R.D – Help Me
N.E.R.D – Hot N Fun (live version)
Boys Like Girls – Heart Heart Heartbreak 
Boys Like Girls – Heels Over Head
Harry Connick Jr. – Christmas Set from NYC
Stone Sour – Made of Scars
Lamb of God – Set To Fail
Lamb of God – Now You've Got Something To Die For
Lamb of God – Walk With Me In Hell
Job For A Cowboy – Altered Through Catechization 
Job For A Cowboy – Unfurling a Darkened Gospel
Terror – Lost
Terror – Betrayer
Terror – Never Alone
Killswitch Engage – Life to Lifeless

Documentaries (produced) 
HORI SMOKU – The Story of Norman "Sailor Jerry" Collins
Hellfest video documentaries

References

External links 
 Space Monkey Studios, inc. official site
 Interview With Doug Spangenberg PreachingBackToPreachers.com

American music video directors
Living people
1975 births
Place of birth missing (living people)